Diggiloo is an outdoor summertime show where famous artists tour Sweden, performing songs accompanied by a live band. It debuted in 2003 with shows only in Båstad, before becoming a touring event in 2004. In 2020, due to the Covid 19 pandemic the tour was cancelled for the first time since its inception.

Performers 
Key:  Singer   Comedian  Trumpeter

Gallery

References

External links

2003 establishments in Sweden
Recurring events established in 2003
Swedish music